Oliver Richard Jessel (24 August 1929 – 21 June 2017) was a New Zealand born British businessman who through Jessel Securities owned the Demerara Sugar Company, P&O, the steel companies Firth Brown and Johnsons, and the financial services company France Fenwick. In 1968 he acquired London Indemnity & General Insurance which proved to be his downfall when he was forced to liquidate his fortune to support the firm after heavy redemption of its products by savers.

Personal life
Jessel's younger brother, Toby, was a Member of Parliament. His younger sister, Camilla, was the wife of the Polish-born composer Andrzej Panufnik.

See also
Jim Slater

References 

1929 births
2017 deaths
British businesspeople
British Jews
People educated at Rugby School
New Zealand businesspeople
New Zealand emigrants to the United Kingdom
New Zealand Jews